Auerodendron northropianum is a plant species of the family Rhamnaceae that is native to the Caribbean and is found in the Bahamas. It is also found in Cuba,  usually in coastal forests. Its habit is a shrub and it has simple leaves. The leaflets are pinnate and alternate of each other. The plant is also perennial meaning it persists from year to year the year even in unfavorable conditions. Since it is found in the forests along the coast insects and small animals help to pollinate and disperse the seeds of the plant. The plant is not widely known or abundant in its numbers so it is not widely cultivated or used medicinally.

References

northropianum